The 2003 Italian Open (also known as 2003 Rome Masters or its sponsored title 2003 Telecom Italia Masters) was a tennis tournament played on outdoor clay courts. It was the 60th edition of the Italian Open and was part of the Tennis Masters Series of the 2003 ATP Tour and of Tier I of the 2003 WTA Tour. Both the men's and women's events took place at the Foro Italico in Rome in Italy. The men's tournament was played from May 5 through May 11, 2003 while the women's tournament was played from May 12 through May 18, 2003.

Finals

Men's singles

 Félix Mantilla defeated  Roger Federer 7–5, 6–2, 7–6(10–8)
 It was Mantilla's only title of the year and the 10th of his career. It was also his first and last Masters title.

Women's singles

 Kim Clijsters defeated  Amélie Mauresmo 3–6, 7–6(7–3), 6–0
 It was Clijsters' 5th title of the year and the 20th of her career. It was her 2nd Tier I title of the year and her 2nd overall.

Men's doubles

 Wayne Arthurs /  Paul Hanley defeated  Michaël Llodra  /  Fabrice Santoro 6–1, 6–3
 It was Arthurs' 2nd title of the year and the 8th of his career. It was Hanley's 3rd title of the year and the 4th of his career.

Women's doubles

 Svetlana Kuznetsova /  Martina Navratilova defeated  Jelena Dokić /  Nadia Petrova 6–4, 5–7, 6–2
 It was Kuznetsova's 3rd title of the year and the 8th of her career. It was Navrátilová's 4th title of the year and the 345th of her career.

References

External links
 Official website  
 Official website 
 ATP Tournament Profile
 WTA Tournament Profile

Italian Open
Italian Open
 
Italian Open
2003 Italian Open (Tennis)